Gerard J. Holzmann (born 1951) is a Dutch-American computer scientist and researcher at Bell Labs and NASA, best known as the developer of the SPIN model checker.

Biography 
Holzmann was born in Amsterdam, Netherlands and received an Engineer's degree in electrical engineering from the Delft University of Technology in 1976. He subsequently also received his PhD degree from Delft University in 1979 under W.L. van der Poel and J.L. de Kroes with a thesis entitled Coordination problems in multiprocessing systems. After receiving a Fulbright Scholarship he was a post-graduate student at the University of Southern California for another year, where he worked with Per Brinch Hansen.

In 1980 he started at Bell Labs in Murray Hill for a year. Back in the Netherlands he was assistant professor at the Delft University of Technology for two years. In 1983 he returned to Bell Labs where he worked in the Computing Science Research Center (the former Unix research group). In 2003 he joined  NASA, where he leads the NASA JPL Laboratory for Reliable Software in Pasadena, California and is a JPL fellow.

In 1981 Holzmann was awarded the Prof. Bahler Prize by the Royal Dutch Institute of Engineers, the Software System Award (for Spin) in 2001 by the Association for Computing Machinery (ACM), the Paris Kanellakis Theory and Practice Award in 2005, and the NASA Exceptional Engineering Achievement Medal in  October 2012. Holzmann was elected a member of the US National Academy of Engineering in 2005 for the creation of model-checking systems for software verification. In 2011 he was inducted as a Fellow of the Association for Computing Machinery. In 2015 he was awarded the IEEE Harlan D. Mills Award.

Work 
Holzmann is known for the development of the SPIN model checker (SPIN is short for Simple Promela Interpreter) in the 1980s at Bell Labs. This device can verify the correctness of concurrent software, since 1991 freely available.

Books 
Publications, a selection:
 The Spin Model Checker — Primer and Reference Manual, Addison-Wesley, 2003. .
 Design and Validation of Computer Protocols, Prentice Hall, 1991.
 The Early History of Data Networks, IEEE Computer Society Press, 1995.
 Beyond Photography — The Digital Darkroom, Prentice Hall, 1988. .

References

External links 
 Home page
 Interview

1951 births
Living people
American computer scientists
Dutch computer scientists
Formal methods people
Scientists at Bell Labs
Delft University of Technology alumni
Scientists from Amsterdam
NASA people
Dutch emigrants to the United States
Fellows of the Association for Computing Machinery
Members of the United States National Academy of Engineering
Fellows of Jet Propulsion Laboratory